Terminal Samambaia is a Federal District Metro brazilian station on Orange line. It opened on 31 March 2001 on the inaugural section of the line, from Central to Terminal Samambaia, and remains the southern terminus of the line. The adjacent station is Samambaia Sul.

References

Brasília Metro stations
2001 establishments in Brazil
Railway stations opened in 2001